The 2026 EHF European Men's Handball Championship, commonly referred to as the EHF Euro 2026, will be the 17th edition of the EHF European Men's Handball Championship, the biennial international men's handball championship of Europe organized by EHF.

Bid process

Bidding timeline
The bidding timeline was as follows:

 4 June 2020: Invitation to National Federations to provide a letter of intent to the EHF for hosting the EHF EUROs 2026 & 2028
 1 October 2020: Deadline for submitting the letter of intent and request for the bidding documents by the interested federations
 1 November 2020: Dispatch of the manual for staging the EHF EUROs 2026 & 2028 together with the relevant specifications and forms by the EHF
 1 May 2021: Applications available at the EHF Office
 May/June 2021: Evaluation of bids by the EHF
 June 2021: Approval of applications by EHF EXEC
 June–September 2021: Site inspections
 September 2021: Further evaluation after inspections
 September 2021: Confirmation of bids for the EHF EUROs 2026 & 2028
 17/18 November 2021: Allocation at the EO EHF Congress 2021

Bids
On 11 May 2021 it was announced that the following nations sent in an official expression of interest:
 ,  & 
  Withdrew in October 2021. Switzerland bid for 2028.

Host selection 
As only the Scandinavian bid remained it was unanimously selected at the 14th EHF Extraordinary Congress on 20 November 2021.

Qualification

Qualified teams

Note: Bold indicates champion for that year. Italic indicates host for that year.

References

External links 
 Bid website of the European Handball Federation

 
European Men's Handball Championship
2026 in handball
2026 in European sport
European Men's Handball Championship
European Championship, Men, 2026
European Championship, Men, 2026
European Championship, Men, 2026
European Men's